The third season of Teenage Mutant Ninja Turtles originally aired between October 9, 2004, and April 23, 2005, beginning with the "Space Invaders, Part 1" episode. The entire season of the television series was released on DVD in seven volumes from March 15, 2005, through May 16, 2006. This is the only season of the 2003 series which has a prodcode, and included a Christmas episode under the title "The Christmas Aliens".

Story
The Triceraton Republic launches a massive invasion of Earth, believing Professor Honeycutt to be hiding on the planet. After wreaking havoc on the planet, they are convinced to leave by Donatello, who reveals Honeycutt's departure, only for Honeycutt to return to Earth, intending to surrender himself to the Triceratons. Honeycutt and the Turtles are abducted by the Earth Protection Force, led by Agent Bishop, who has allied with the Federation. While Traximus deposes Zanramon, Honeycutt sacrifices himself to upload a computer virus to the Triceraton and Federation fleet. Traximus jails Zanramon and Blanque and declares a new era of peace. Having observed the damage that has been done to Earth from the sidelines, Shredder uses his Oroku Saki persona to help in the reconstruction of New York, secretly salvaging Triceraton technology for an unknown purpose, while Bishop schemes to create an army of super-soldiers.

Splinter and the Turtles are visited by "Ultimate Drako", a fusion of Ue-Sama and Drako, who wield Lord Simultaneous' Time Scepter, and scatter the group across time and space. Michelangelo arrives in a world where the Turtles are superheroes fighting a villainous Splinter, Raphael enters the world of the Planet Racers franchise, Donatello suffers in an alternate timeline where the Shredder has conquered the Earth, and Leonardo arrives in Miyamoto Usagi's dimension. With Usagi's help, Leo travels to the Battle Nexus and is able to reunite his brothers and Splinter, and defeat Ultimate Drako. Though the duo are separated and Drako perishes, Ue-Sama is restored to a youthful form and reunited with his father.

After receiving a vision of the Shredder departing Earth to conquer the Utrom home world, Splinter rallies the Turtles, Casey, April, Leatherhead and Honeycutt (who were revealed to have survived their supposed deaths) to storm the Shredder's stronghold on the eve of his departure in a massive spacecraft. Bishop also enters the fray with Stockman on his side, but Shredder is able to lift off with Karai and Dr. Chaplin, with the Turtles and Splinter stowing away. As Bishop continues to assault the ship in space, the Shredder viciously wounds his foes, who decide to sacrifice their lives by detonating the ship's power core to kill the Shredder. Fortunately, the Utroms arrive just in time to save them all and find the Shredder guilty of numerous war crimes and atrocities, banishing him forever to a desolate ice asteroid.

Cast
 Michael Sinterniklaas as Leo: the leader of the Turtles. (26 episodes)
 Frank Frankson as Raph: Leo's second-in-command who can be stubborn. (26 episodes)
 Wayne Grayson as Mike: the Turtles' youngest member and a source of comic relief. (26 episodes)
 Sam Riegel as Don: the Turtles' genius engineer who is identified as the member who holds the team together. (26 episodes)

Supporting
 Darren Dunstan as Splinter: the Turtles' sensei and adopted father, who comes to realize his destiny as a guardian of the Utroms. (21 episodes (has no lines in episode 2))
 Veronica Taylor as April: an ally of the Turtles who enters a relationship with Casey. (14 episodes (has no lines in episodes 4 and 26))
 Marc Thompson as Casey: an ally of the Turtles who enters a relationship with April. (15 episodes)
 F.B. Owens as
 Traximus: an honorable Triceraton gladiator the Turtles befriended in the previous season, now a leader of a rebel cell who seek to dethrone Zanramon.
 Leatherhead: a mutant alligator who is a loyal ally of the Turtles.
 Oliver Wyman as Honeycutt/Fugitoid: a Federation scientist whose mind was accidentally uploaded into an android's body, who possesses the plans for a teleportation device warred over by the Triceratons and Federation.
 Jason Griffith as Miyamoto Usagi: an ally of the Turtles who Leonardo encounters during an impromptu visit to his dimension.

Villains
 Scottie Ray as Ch'rell / Oroku Saki / The Shredder: the main antagonist of the series and the leader of the Foot Clan, who uses his wealth to help repair New York for an ulterior motive. (9 episodes)
 Karen Neill as Karai: the Shredder's adopted daughter and second-in-command, whose allegiance and devoted service come into question, as Leonardo tries to convince her to change sides.
 Greg Carey as Hun: a hulking gangster who struggles to stay in the Shredder's favor after several failures.
 Scott Williams as Stockman: a brilliant scientist who often attempts to sabotage the Shredder for his own personal gain. (8 episodes)
 Sam Riegel as Dr. Chaplin: a young scientist who threatens not only Stockman's place in the Foot hierarchy, but his life as well.
 David Zen Mansley as John Bishop: a black ops agent in charge of the Earth Protection Force, an organization devoted to defending Earth from alien invasion.
 Michael Alston Bailey as Zanramon: the despotic Prime Leader of the Triceraton Republic who invades Earth to find Professor Honeycutt.
 Dan Green as Commander Mozar: a seasoned veteran who serves as Zanramon's second-in-command.
 Oliver Wyman as General Blanque: the leader of the Federation.
 Ted Lewis as Ue-Sama: a warrior prince who goes by the title "Ultimate Ninja", who merges with Drako and seeks vengeance on the Turtles.
 Marc Thompson as Drako: an enemy of Splinter who is merged with Ue-Sama and seeks revenge on him.

Crew
Teenage Mutant Ninja Turtles was produced by Mirage Studios, 4 Kids Entertainment, 4Kids Productions, and Dong Woo Animation and distributed by 4 Kids Entertainment and was aired on Fox's Saturday morning kids' block in the US. The producers were Gary Richardson, Frederick U. Fierst, and Joellyn Marlow for the American team; Tae Ho Han was the producer for the Korean team.

Reception
The third season received critical acclaim. Same As It Never Was was its most-watched episode. As of May 2005, it had 3.56 million views and has a rank of 92%.

Episodes

References

External links

 Season One Episode list with detailed synopses at the Official Ninja Turtles website

2004 American television seasons
2005 American television seasons
Season 3
Television shows set in Beijing
Television episodes set in China
Television episodes about alien invasion
Usagi Yojimbo